The 1892 Drexel Dragons football team represented the Drexel Institute—now known as Drexel University–as an independent during the 1892 college football season.  The team did not have a head coach.

Schedule

Roster

References

Drexel
Drexel Dragons football seasons
College football winless seasons
Drexel Dragons football